President François Tombalbaye faced a task of considerable magnitude when Chad became a sovereign state in 1960. His challenge was to build a nation out of a vast and diverse territory that had poor communications, few known resources, a tiny market, and a collection of impoverished people with sharply differing political traditions, ethnic and regional loyalties, and sociocultural patterns. The French colonial powers that had created the country's boundaries had done little to promote economic interdependence, political cooperation, or crosscultural understanding. Chadians who had hoped that the country's first president might turn out to be a state builder like the 13th century's Dabbalemi or the 16th century's Aluma were soon disappointed. During its first fifteen years, Chad under Tombalbaye experienced worsening economic conditions, eventual alienation of the most patient of foreign allies, exacerbation of ethnic and regional conflict, and grave weakening of the state as an instrument of governance.

References

Presidencies
 
1960s in Chad
1970s in Chad